"Tales of Brave Ulysses" is a song recorded in 1967 by British group Cream.  It was released as the B-side to the "Strange Brew" single in June 1967. In November, the song was included on Cream's second album, Disraeli Gears.  The song features one of the earliest uses of a wah-wah pedal, which guitarist Eric Clapton plays throughout the song.  Cream's song "White Room" copies the chord progression to a large extent.

Background
The song was the first collaboration between guitarist Eric Clapton and artist Martin Sharp. Clapton composed the music, inspired by the Lovin' Spoonful's 1966 hit "Summer in the City". "I just started chatting to Eric", said Sharp, who lived in the same building. "I told him I had written a poem. He, in turn, told me he'd written some music. So I gave him my poem. Two weeks later, he turned up with it on the B-side of a 45 record." Sharp had written the lyrics to the melody of Leonard Cohen's song "Suzanne", specifically the Judy Collins version.

The song was the B-side for "Strange Brew" in June 1967, several months ahead of the group's second album, Disraeli Gears, which included both songs.  Cash Box called it a "visionary hard rock excursion."  AllMusic's Matthew Greenwald calls it, "One of a few overtly psychedelic songs to have aged gracefully ... Lyrically, it's a relatively factual and colorful rendering of the great Greek tragedy Ulysses".

In his 2007 autobiography, Clapton recalls:

The song uses a descending tetrachord bass line of D/C/B/B-flat, which Greenwald describes as "simple but effective".  Jack Bruce, on bass, also provides the vocal, and Ginger Baker is on drums.

Cream recorded the song at Atlantic Studios in New York City in May 1967, during the sessions for Disraeli Gears.  Atlantic brought in engineer Tom Dowd and producer Felix Pappalardi to work with Cream on their next album.  For the recording, Clapton used a wah-wah pedal guitar effects unit for the first time.

Cream performed the song in concert and a 10 March 1968 recording from Winterland in San Francisco is included on Live Cream Volume II.  In May 1968, the group were filmed performing it for The Smothers Brothers Comedy Hour television programme.  "Tales of Brave Ulysses" was later overshadowed by "White Room", which utilised the wah-wah and a superficially similar chord progression (although starting on Dm instead of D major) to create one of Cream's biggest hits.

References

Sources
Hjort, Christopher (2007). Strange Brew: Eric Clapton & the British Blues Boom, 1965–1970. London, UK: Jawbone Press. pp. g. 29. .
Ertegün, Ahmet (2006). Classic Albums: Cream – Disraeli Gears (DVD). Eagle Rock Entertainment.

External links

1967 songs
Cream (band) songs
Songs written by Eric Clapton
Song recordings produced by Felix Pappalardi
Atco Records singles
Polydor Records singles
Songs based on poems
Music based on works by Homer
Works based on the Odyssey